La herida del tiempo (English title:The wound of time) is a Mexican telenovela produced by Televisa and transmitted by Telesistema Mexicano.

Cast 
Miguel Ángel Ferriz Sr.
Angelines Fernández
Miguel Córcega
Aurora Molina
Graciela Döring
Rafael del Río
Jose Antonio Cossi
Emma Arvizu

References 

Mexican telenovelas
1962 telenovelas
Televisa telenovelas
1962 Mexican television series debuts
1962 Mexican television series endings
Spanish-language telenovelas